The Best of Kiss, Volume 3: The Millennium Collection is the first compilation to feature exclusively the 1990s output from Kiss. The album was released on November 21, 2006. It is the final installment in the Millennium Collection trilogy of albums featuring material from the band Kiss.

This disc, along with Volumes 1 and 2 of the Millennium Collection was repackaged and released as a collection known as Playlist...Plus.

Track listing

Personnel
Members
Paul Stanley – Vocals, Rhythm Guitar, Guitar Solo (track 11-12), Acoustic Guitar (tracks 6-8, 12), Bass (track 11)
Gene Simmons – Vocals, Bass
Peter Criss – Drums (track 10)
Ace Frehley – Vocals and Lead Guitar (track 10)
Eric Carr – Backing Vocals (track 1)
Bruce Kulick – Lead Guitar, Bass (tracks 6, 9 & 12), Acoustic Guitar Solo (track 6), Backing Vocals
Eric Singer – Drums, Backing Vocals
Tommy Thayer – Lead Guitar (tracks 9 & 11)

Additional personnel
Steve Ferrone – Drums (track 12)
Kevin Valentine – Drums (tracks 9 & 11)
David Campbell - strings & horn arrangement (track 12)

References

Kiss
Kiss (band) compilation albums
2006 greatest hits albums